Admir Vladavić (born 29 June 1982) is a Bosnian retired professional footballer who played as a winger.

Club career
Born in Ljubinje, Vladavić's career began in a small club Iskra Stolac, which consisted mainly of refugees from Stolac who lived in Mostar during the Bosnian War. He was spotted there by Velež Mostar and soon signed a contract. Although he was one of the youngest members of the club, Vladavić became a regular first team choice. His speed and good technical abilities made him interesting for other Bosnian clubs. Since Velež was playing in the second division at the time, and his ambitions were much bigger, Vladavić was determined to move. Sarajevo showed its interest, but they could not agree. In the summer of 2005, he moved to Željezničar.

Two years later, in February 2007, Vladavić signed a contract with Slovak Super Liga club Žilina, with whom he won the league title in May of that same year. In July 2009, Austrian champions Red Bull Salzburg signed Vladavić and managed to win the Austrian Bundesliga with them the next year. On 1 June 2011, he came back to Bosnia and Herzegovina and joined Olimpik from Sarajevo. On 18 January 2012, Vladavić signed with Czech club Karviná. In March 2013, he came back to Velež after eight years on a loan deal. On 1 January 2014, he joined Maltese Premier League club Sliema Wanderers. On 7 July 2014, Vladavić once again came back to Velež where he finished his career in December 2014 at the age of 32.

International career
Good games secured Vladavić a call to the Bosnia and Herzegovina national team. He made his debut on 28 February 2006 in a game against Japan. In the next three years with the national team, Vladavić managed to make 11 more caps after the game against Japan, not scoring any goals. His final international was an October 2009 World Cup qualification match against Spain.

Personal life
Vladavić and his wife, Ajla, have a son named Zinedin. His son is named after famous French player Zinedine Zidane

Honours

Player
Žilina
Slovak Super Liga: 2006–07

Red Bull Salzburg
Austrian Bundesliga: 2009–10

References

External links

Admir Vladavić at Footballdatabase

1982 births
Living people
People from Ljubinje
Association football midfielders
Bosnia and Herzegovina footballers
Bosnia and Herzegovina international footballers
FK Velež Mostar players
FK Željezničar Sarajevo players
MŠK Žilina players
FC Red Bull Salzburg players
FK Olimpik players
MFK Karviná players
Sliema Wanderers F.C. players
Premier League of Bosnia and Herzegovina players
First League of the Federation of Bosnia and Herzegovina players
Slovak Super Liga players
Austrian Football Bundesliga players
Czech National Football League players
Maltese Premier League players
Bosnia and Herzegovina expatriate footballers
Expatriate footballers in Slovakia
Bosnia and Herzegovina expatriate sportspeople in Slovakia
Expatriate footballers in Austria
Bosnia and Herzegovina expatriate sportspeople in Austria
Expatriate footballers in the Czech Republic
Bosnia and Herzegovina expatriate sportspeople in the Czech Republic
Expatriate footballers in Malta
Bosnia and Herzegovina expatriate sportspeople in Malta